The Anderson Museum of Art (previously known as the Anderson Center for the Arts) is located in downtown Anderson, Indiana at 32 West 10th Street in the former Carnegie Library building built partly in honor of educator and railroad executive John Byers Anderson. The building, as Carnegie Public Library, is listed in the National Register of Historic Places.

History
The center is located in the Beaux-Arts-style former Carnegie library. Andrew Carnegie provided a $50,000 grant for the building's construction. The library moved to a new facility in 1987.

The museum specializes in collecting Indiana and contemporary art.

References

Cited works
 Anderson: A Pictorial History by Esther Dittlinger, copyright 1990, page 192.

External links
 

Library buildings completed in 1905
Buildings and structures in Anderson, Indiana
Carnegie libraries in Indiana
Libraries on the National Register of Historic Places in Indiana
National Register of Historic Places in Madison County, Indiana
Museums in Madison County, Indiana
Art museums and galleries in Indiana
Former library buildings in the United States
Arts centers in Indiana
Beaux-Arts architecture in Indiana
Tourist attractions in Anderson, Indiana
1905 establishments in Indiana